The 1918 William & Mary Indians football team represented the College of William & Mary as a member of the South Atlantic Intercollegiate Athletic Association (SAIAA) during the 1918 college football season. Led by Vernon Geddy in his first and only year as head coach, William & Mary finished the season with an overall record of 0–2 and a mark of 0–1 in SAIAA play.

Schedule

References

William and Mary
William & Mary Tribe football seasons
College football winless seasons
William and Mary Indians football team